The former Government Building is a heritage building in Christchurch, New Zealand. It was designed by Joseph Maddison in 1909. It is a Category I heritage building listed with Heritage New Zealand.

History 
The building was designed to centralise various government departments in Christchurch that had previously been housed in the Canterbury Provincial Council Buildings and other rented spaces throughout the city. The Government Buildings opened in 1913 and housed various Government departments up until the 1980s. The last Government department to occupy the building was the Ministry of Works and Development. After being vacant for some time the building was threatened to be demolished in 1991. On 11 July 1991 the Christchurch City Council purchased the building from the government for $735,000. The council then sold it to the ‘Symphony Group’ in 1995 and it was converted into a hotel with the conditions to strengthen and conserve the building. It is now home to the Heritage Hotel Christchurch and the bar O.G.B.

References 

Heritage New Zealand Category 1 historic places in Canterbury, New Zealand
Buildings and structures in Christchurch
Christchurch Central City
1910s architecture in New Zealand